Mir Zabid Ali Reki is a Pakistani politician who is member of the Provincial Assembly of the Balochistan.

Political career
Reki contested 2018 Pakistani general election from constituency PB-41 of Provincial Assembly of the Balochistan on the ticket of Muttahida Majlis-e-Amal. He won the election by the majority of 460 votes over the runner up Mir Mujeebur Rehman Muhammad Hassani of Balochistan Awami Party. He garnered 12,782 votes while Hassani received 12,322 votes. Hassani contested the results with Election Commission of Pakistan (ECP) based on purported abduction of the presiding officer, ECP ordered the re-election in 2 polling stations of this constituency out of a total of 98 polling stations.

Re-election on two polling stations of PB-41 was held on 7 October 2018. Reki became the member of Balochistan Assembly after the re-election.

References

Living people
Muttahida Majlis-e-Amal MPAs (Balochistan)
Politicians from Balochistan, Pakistan
Year of birth missing (living people)